Preben Rasmussen (born 14 November 1941) is a Danish boxer. He competed in the men's light welterweight event at the 1964 Summer Olympics.

References

1941 births
Living people
Danish male boxers
Olympic boxers of Denmark
Boxers at the 1964 Summer Olympics
Sportspeople from Copenhagen
Light-welterweight boxers